Isabel Bras Williamson (1430–1493), was a Scottish merchant. She belonged to the most prominent burgesses in Edinburgh. She was a supplier of the royal court, traded in cloth with Europe and had an important part in the Scottish textile industry.

References 

 The Biographical Dictionary of Scottish Women (Hardcover) by Elizabeth L. Ewan, Sue Innes
 List of famous women

1430 births
1493 deaths
15th-century Scottish businesspeople
15th-century Scottish women
Medieval businesswomen